= Clinics in Endocrinology and Metabolism =

- Discipline: Endocrinology, Metabolism
- Language: English

Publication details
- History: 1972-1986; Split into Baillière's Clinical Endocrinology and Metabolism and Endocrinology and Metabolism Clinics of North America
- Publisher: W B Saunders (England)

Standard abbreviations
- ISO 4: Clin. Endocrinol. Metab.

Indexing
- ISSN: 0300-595X

Clinics in Endocrinology and Metabolism was a scientific journal in the field of endocrinology, which was continued as Baillière's Clinical Endocrinology and Metabolism.
